The Iacobeni mine is a large mine in the north of Romania in Suceava County, 96 km southwest of Suceava and 340 km north of the capital, Bucharest. Iacobeni represents the third largest copper reserve in Romania having estimated reserves of 200 million tonnes of ore grading 0.4% copper. The mine also has one of the largest manganese reserves in Romania estimated at 2.5 million tonnes of ore with an annual production of around 70,000 tonnes.

References

External links 
 Official site

Copper mines in Romania
Manganese mines in Romania